Houx is a commune in the Eure-et-Loir department in northern France, located 79 km from Paris and 20 km from Chartres.

Population

See also
Communes of the Eure-et-Loir department

References

Communes of Eure-et-Loir